Pulsar is a 2010 Belgian techno-thriller film directed by Alex Stockman and starring Matthias Schoenaerts.

Plot
Samuel works in Brussels as a pharmaceutical delivery man. His girlfriend, Mireille, moves to New York to intern at a prestigious architecture firm. After her departure, Sam's computer is hacked. The mysterious hacker seems intent on messing up Samuel's life and his relationship with Mireille. Sam starts to suspect his neighbors and gets obsessed with WiFi-rays.

Cast
Matthias Schoenaerts as Samuel Verbist
Tine Van den Wyngaert as Mireille Leduc
Andrea Bardos as Schoonmaakster
Leah Chanmugam as Buurmeisje
Liesje De Backer as Liesbet
Jessica De Baere as Ellen
Josse De Pauw as Vader

References

External links 
 
 
 Official website

2010 films
2010 thriller drama films
Belgian drama films
Belgian mystery films
Belgian romance films
Techno-thriller films
Films about computing
Films about the Internet
2010s Dutch-language films
2010s English-language films
2010s French-language films
Films set in Brussels
Films set in Belgium
Films shot in Belgium
Belgian thriller drama films
2010s thriller films
2010 drama films
2010 multilingual films
Belgian multilingual films